Tuyền Lâm Lake (hồ Tuyền Lâm) is a man-made lake in Đà Lạt city, in Lâm Đồng Province, Vietnam. It is one of 21 National Tourism Areas. Trúc Lâm Temple can be reached by cable car.

References

Lakes of Vietnam
Landforms of Lâm Đồng province
Tourist attractions in Lâm Đồng province